was a town located in Echi District, Shiga Prefecture, Japan.

As of 2003, the town had an estimated population of 7,964 and a density of 318.05 persons per km2. The total area was 25.04 km2.

On February 13, 2006, Hatashō, along with the town of Echigawa (also from Echi District), was merged to create the town of Aishō.

Dissolved municipalities of Shiga Prefecture
Aisho, Shiga